is an uninhabited island in Hamanaka, Hokkaidō, Japan. It forms part of Akkeshi Prefectural Natural Park. The name is derived from the Ainu kene-pok or "beneath the alder" (Alnus japonica). During studies in 1999, four species of mammal (long-clawed shrew, grey-sided vole, harbour seal, and visiting sika deer) and forty-one species of birds were recorded on the island; there were no amphibians or reptiles. Of the birds, Leach's storm petrel (some twenty thousand pairs), Japanese cormorant, Japanese snipe, slaty-backed gull, and common reed bunting were identified as breeding on Kenbokki. Flora include , Hemerocallis esculenta, and lily-of-the-valley. Masanori Hata founded  after his stay on the island.

References

See also

 List of Natural Monuments of Japan (Hokkaidō)

Hamanaka, Hokkaido
Islands of Hokkaido